The Naga Viper pepper is a hot chili pepper. In 2011, it was recorded as the "World's Hottest Chili" by the Guinness World Records with a rating of 1,382,118 Scoville heat units (SHU), but was surpassed in SHU by the current world record holder, the Carolina Reaper, in 2017.

Origin
The Naga Viper was created in England by chilli farmer Gerald Fowler of the Chilli Pepper Company in Cark, Cumbria. It is claimed to be an unstable three-way hybrid produced from the Naga Morich, the Bhut jolokia and the Trinidad scorpion, which are some of the world's hottest peppers.

See also 

 Race to grow the hottest pepper

References

Chili peppers
Food and drink introduced in 2010